Morris William "Mo" Shapir (9 September 1917 — 15 August 1942) was an Australian rules footballer who played with North Melbourne. He was killed in action serving with the R.A.A.F. in World War II.

Family
The son of Eleazar Shapir (1898-1988) and Rosetta Blanche Shapir (1898-1975), née Gooding, Morris William Shapir was born in South Melbourne on 9 September 1917.

He was engaged to Norma Turnbull (his death prevented their marriage).

Football
Recruited from Melbourne High School Old Boys (MHSOB) in the Victorian Amateur Football Association (VAFA).

He sustained a leg injury in the 1936 pre-season training.

Military service
Shapir served in the Royal Australian Air Force as a Flight Sergeant.

On 22 October 1941, Shapir's flak-damaged Vickers Wellington (IV R1765), piloted by RAF Flight Lieutenant James Anthony Hosking "Jimmie" Sargeaunt, crashed while returning from a bombing raid. The crew bailed out over Aldershot in England. One of the crew (the rear gunner who had not bailed out) died, and another two were wounded (including Shapir who suffered internal injuries and a broken leg).

Death
On 15 August 1942, the bomber Shapir was on (Wellington IC DV676), piloted by RAF Flight Sergeant Alfred Ronald Beaven (1269424), was lost over British-occupied Egypt. Shapir's remains were not found, and he is commemorated on the Alamein Memorial.

See also
 List of Victorian Football League players who died on active service

Footnotes

References
 Main, J. & Allen, D., "Shapir, Morris", pp.332-334 in Main, J. & Allen, D., Fallen – The Ultimate Heroes: Footballers Who Never Returned From War, Crown Content, (Melbourne), 2002. 
 Holmesby, Russell & Main, Jim (2007). The Encyclopedia of AFL Footballers. 7th ed. Melbourne: Bas Publishing.
 Roll of Honour Circular: Flight Sergeant Morris William Shapir (400357), collection of the Australian War Memorial.
 Roll of Honour: Flight Sergeant Morris William Shapir (400357), Australian War Memorial.
 Air Forces WW2 Casualty: Flight Sergeant Morris William SHAPIR (400357) of the Royal Australian Air Force, Royal Air Force Commands.
 Flight Sergeant Morris William Shapir (400357), Commonwealth War Graves Commission.

External links
 
 

1917 births
1942 deaths
Australian Jews
People educated at Melbourne High School
Australian rules footballers from Melbourne
North Melbourne Football Club players
Australian military personnel killed in World War II
Royal Australian Air Force personnel of World War II
Royal Australian Air Force airmen
People from South Melbourne
Military personnel from Melbourne